Minogue  is a surname of Irish origin, which is an anglicized form of the Gaelic Ó Muineog, meaning "descendant of Muineog", which is a name derived from manach ("monk"). Notable people with the surname include:

Áine Minogue (born 1977), Irish musician
Craig Minogue (born 1962), Australian convicted murderer 
Dan Minogue (1891–1961), Australian footballer
Dan Minogue (politician) (1893–1983), Australian politician
Dannii Minogue (born 1971), Australian singer-songwriter
Walter Minogue (1910-1958), Australian rules footballer
Kenneth Minogue (1930–2013), Australian political scientist
John Minogue (born 1959), Irish hurling manager and former player
Kylie Minogue (born 1968), Australian singer, songwriter and actress
Mike Minogue (1923–2008), New Zealand politician
Mike Minogue (actor), New Zealand actor

See also
Monahan
Monologue

References

Surnames of Irish origin
Occupational surnames
English-language surnames
Anglicised Irish-language surnames
Surnames of British Isles origin